Sharafat is a 1974 Pakistani Urdu film produced By Sheikh Abdul Shakoor & Sheikh Abdul Wahid ,directed by Nazar-ul-Islam and written by Bashir Niaz. The lead cast included Nadeem, Shabnum, and Qavi. The music of the film was composed by Robin Ghosh and one of the playback tracks, "Teray Bheegay Badan Ki Khushboo Se" became an all-time hit. Sharafat received 4 Nigar Awards in various categories of filmmaking.

Synopsis
A poor woman dies because her only son is unable to provide her with the treatment she needs to survive. The son turns into a white-shirt thief and later falls in love with a fallen girl.

Cast
 Nadeem
 Shabnam
 Qavi
 Allaudin
 Nayyar Sultana
 Lehri
 Sofia Bano
 Masood Akhtar
 Nanha
 Munawar Saeed
 Saqi
 Seema
 Ibrahim Nafees
 Kamal Irani

Music and soundtracks
The music of Sharafat was composed by Robin Ghosh and the songs were penned by Kaleem Usmani:

Awards
Sharafat won 4 Nigar Awards for the following categories:

References

1974 films
Pakistani romantic musical films
1970s Urdu-language films
Nigar Award winners
Pakistani romantic drama films
1974 drama films
Films scored by Robin Ghosh
Urdu-language Pakistani films